Mudaima (Tamil: முட்டை மா) is served by the Sri Lankan Tamils as a strengthening food. It is brown colored and sandy like flour. It is very sweet. It is called mudai-ma because mudai means egg and ma means flour in Tamil. So the primary ingredients for mudaiman are eggs, flour and sugar.

Sri Lankan Tamil people